Vishak Nair is an Indian actor known for his roles in numerous feature films in Malayalam and Hindi. He made his debut in the 2016 coming-of-age drama "Aanandam," which received critical acclaim and made him a household name in Kerala.

In 2022, Vishak made his Bollywood debut with the sports biopic "Shabaash Mithu".

Vishak is set to appear in the upcoming film "Emergency" directed by Kangana Ranaut, in which he will be playing the role of Sanjay Gandhi. The film is a political drama is one of the most highly anticipated releases of the year.

Early life and background 
Vishak Nair was born on April 25, 1992 to S. Balachandran Nair and Jaya Balachandran. He spent his childhood in Sharjah, where he did his schooling at Delhi Private School. From a young age, Nair had a keen interest in filmmaking and started making short films. After completing his schooling, he pursued a degree in B.Tech Mechanical Engineering from NITK Surathkal.

During his time at NITK, Nair was introduced to theatre and continued writing and directing short films. After graduation, he worked for Daimler India Commercial Vehicles in Chennai, but his passion for the arts led him to work with The Little Theatre Chennai and other theatre groups in the city.

Nair's love for acting and filmmaking led him to make his feature film debut in 2016 with the Malayalam film "Aanandam".

On June 9, 2022, Vishak married Jayapria Nair in a ceremony held in Bangalore.

Career
Vishak Nair began his acting career in 2016 with the Malayalam film Aanandam, a coming-of-age story that received critical acclaim and commercial success. Following his debut, he went on to star in several other Malayalam films including Chunkzz (2017), Puthen Panam (2017), Matchbox (2017), Chembarathipoo (2017), and Aana Alaralodalaral (2017).

He further appeared in Lonappante Mamodeesa (2019), Kuttymama (2019), Chiri (2021) and Thimiram (2021) and ventured into the world of web series with his well-received performance in Kili (2021). Additionally, he directed a two part music video for Aabha Hanjura's Roshewalla which was featured in Rolling Stone Magazine's Top Ten Music Videos of 2019.

In 2022, Nair made his Bollywood debut with the film Shabaash Mithu, in which he played a supporting role alongside Taapsee Pannu. He also had cameo appearances in the Malayalam films Hridayam (in which he also worked as a Casting Director), Wonder Women, and Dear Friend.

Vishak directed the music video for Vineet Vincent's Colour, which was met with critical acclaim upon its release.

He will be seen next in the much-awaited Kangana Ranaut directorial Emergency, in which he will portray the role of Sanjay Gandhi. Additionally, he will be seen in the Hindi film Tejas directed by Sarvesh Mewara. Apart from his Bollywood projects, Vishak also has several Malayalam films in the pipeline, including Exit, LLB, and Shalamon. He is currently working on Saiju Sreedharan's directorial debut in which he will be playing the lead role.

Filmography

As actor

As director

References

External links 
 
 

Male actors from Kochi
Male actors in Malayalam cinema
Indian male film actors
21st-century Indian male actors